Racing Football Club, usually known as Racing Gonaïves, is a professional football club based in Gonaïves, Haiti.

History
Racing des Gonaïves was founded on 7 April 1962, by a Catholic priest named Louis Simon. He named it after Racing Haïtien whom he was a fan of and donned the same yellow and blue colours.

Honours
Ligue Haïtienne: 3
1996, 2008 F, 2016 O

International competitions
CONCACAF Champions League: 4 appearances
1985 – First Round (Caribbean) – Lost against  Golden Star (football club) 1 – 0 on aggregate (stage 1 of ?)
1991 – Second Round (Caribbean) – Lost against  US Marinoise 4 – 3 on aggregate (stage 2 of 7)
1993 – First Round (Caribbean) – Lost against  Aiglon du Lamentin 4 – 0 on aggregate (stage 1 of 5)
1994 – First Round (Caribbean) – Withdrew against  FC AK Regina (stage 2 of 7)

CONCACAF Cup Winners Cup: 1 appearance
1991 – Fourth place

CFU Club Championship: 1 appearance
2010 – Second Round – Group E – 2nd place – 0 pts (stage 2 of 3) – lost against  Puerto Rico Islanders – 0–2, 3–0; 5–0 on aggregate

References

Football clubs in Haiti
Artibonite (department)